The 1962–63 Scottish Second Division was won by St Johnstone who, along with second placed East Stirlingshire, were promoted to the First Division. Brechin City finished bottom.

Table

References 

 Scottish Football Archive

Scottish Division Two seasons
2
Scot